Ashby station is an underground Bay Area Rapid Transit (BART) station in Berkeley, California. The station is located beneath Adeline Street to the south of its intersection with Ashby Avenue. The station includes park-and-ride facilities with 715 automobile parking spaces in two separate parking lots.

History 

The station site is approximately at the historic location of Berkeley Branch Railroad's Newbury Station, which opened after 1876.

The three stations in Berkeley were originally planned to be elevated, but the City of Berkeley paid extra tax to have them built underground. The station design was controversial because it was not fully underground; the west side of the mezzanine is level with the parking lot. Service at Ashby station began on January 29, 1973, as part of the MacArthur to Richmond extension.

Unique in the BART system, the City of Berkeley, rather than BART, controls the air rights on the parking lots. The west parking lot of the station hosts a popular flea market on weekends; a proposed residential development over the west lot has proven locally controversial. Between 2008 and 2010, a portion of the east parking lot was redeveloped as the Ed Roberts Campus, which houses several regional disability-related organizations. The east parking lot and station entrance were closed for construction on August 18, 2008. The east parking lot reopened on April 19, 2010, and the Ed Roberts Campus and the new east entrance opened that November.

The Berkeley City Council approved a memorandum of understanding with BART in December 2019 to begin planning for housing on the station parking lot.

Station layout 
The station has a single island platform located below ground. The fare mezzanine is located at the same level as the west parking lot; stairs and an elevator provide access from Adeline Street overhead.

Bus connections 
The station is served several AC Transit routes that stop in different locations around its perimeter:
Local: 12, 18
Transbay: F
All Nighter: 800

The free West Berkeley Shuttle runs from the station to the West Berkeley area.

See also 
List of Bay Area Rapid Transit stations

References

External links 

BART – Ashby
Ed Roberts Campus

Bay Area Rapid Transit stations in Alameda County, California
Stations on the Orange Line (BART)
Stations on the Red Line (BART)
Buildings and structures in Berkeley, California